Lower White River Museum State Park is a state-run museum located on Main Street in Des Arc, Prairie County, Arkansas, United States, that interprets the history of the lower portion of Arkansas’s White River during the hundred-year period of 1831-1931. Founded in 1970, the museum underwent several name changes before falling under the purview of the museum services division of the parks and tourism department in 1979.

References

External links
Lower White River Museum State Park Arkansas State Parks

Museums in Prairie County, Arkansas
History museums in Arkansas
Transportation museums in Arkansas
State parks of Arkansas
Museums established in 1970
1970 establishments in Arkansas